Eldridge Smerin is an architectural firm based in London. It was formed in 1998, by Nick Eldridge and Piers Smerin.

Eldridge Smerin's first completed project was the Lawns, a house in the Highgate Conservation area.  It was nominated for the 2001 Stirling Prize. Subsequent projects include the Design Council Offices and a house in Highgate Cemetery, nominated for the 2009 Manser Medal and Stephen Lawrence Prize.

Eldridge Smerin also won the 2009 Building Design One-off House Architect of the Year award.

References

External links 
 

Architecture firms based in London